ARY Film Award for Best Supporting Actress is one of the ARY Film Awards of Merit presented annually by the ARY Digital Network and Entertainment Channel to recognize the female actor who has delivered an outstanding performance while working in the film industry. Since its inception, however, the award has commonly been referred to as the AFA for Best Supporting Actor. While actors are nominated for this award by Academy members who are actors and actresses themselves, winners are selected by the AFA membership as a whole.

History

The Best Supporting Actress category has originated with the 1st ARY Film Awards ceremony circa 2014. The Best Supporting Actress is awarded by viewers voting and known as Best Supporting Actress Viewers Choice but officially it is termed as Best Supporting Actress.

Winners and nominees 
For the Best Supporting Actress winner, it is decided by viewers. It is simply regarded as Best Supporting Actress as compared to the other four Jury Awards which have the "super-fix" of Jury. As of the first ceremony, a total of five actresses were nominated. This category is among fourteen Viewers Awards in ARY Film Awards.

Not unlike other award shows, the award ceremony is held for the films of its previous year.

2010s

References

External links 

 ARY Film Awards Official website

ARY Film Award winners
ARY Film Awards
Film awards for supporting actress